Heris (also Romanized as Herīs; also known as Herīz and Teryz) is a village in Guney-ye Gharbi Rural District, Tasuj District, Shabestar County, East Azerbaijan Province, Iran. At the 2006 census, its population was 1,110, in 342 families.

References 

Populated places in Shabestar County